These Happy Golden Years is an autobiographical children's novel written by Laura Ingalls Wilder and published in 1943, the eighth of nine books in her Little House series – although it originally ended it. It is based on her later adolescence near De Smet, South Dakota, featuring her short time as a teacher, beginning at age 15, and her courtship with Almanzo Wilder. It spans the time period from 1882 to 1885, when they marry.

The novel was a Newbery Honor book in 1944, as were the previous four Little House books.

Plot summary

As the novel begins, Pa is taking Laura 12 miles from home in the dead of winter to her first teaching assignment at Brewster settlement. Laura being only 15 and a schoolgirl herself, is apprehensive as this is both the first time she has left home and the first school she has taught, but she is determined to complete her assignment and earn money to keep her sister Mary at her college for the blind in Iowa.

The weather is bitterly cold, and neither the claim shanty where Laura boards or the school can be heated adequately. Some of the children  she is teaching are older than her, and she has difficulty controlling them. Worse, she boards with the head of the school board and his unhappy wife, who does not hide her resentment of Laura. Soon Laura comes to dread living under their roof, particularly during the weekends when she can't escape to school. Much to her surprise and relief, Almanzo begins driving the twenty-four miles to and from the school so that she can return home on weekends. With advice from Ma (a former schoolteacher herself), she is able to adapt and become more self-assured, and successfully completes the two-month assignment.

Laura is surprised when Almanzo continues to invite her out sleighing once she returns home. Their relationship continues, even as she watches her school friends pairing up with beaux, accepting marriage proposals, and leaving school. Sleigh rides give way to buggy rides in the spring, and she impresses Almanzo with her willingness to help break his new and often temperamental horses. Meanwhile, Laura continues to study for her own education, remaining at the head of her classes while also takes odd jobs and another term of teaching in order to earn money for Mary's education. By the time Mary graduates and returns home, Laura's extra earnings have allowed the Ingalls to settle on their claim and begin a peaceful, prosperous life.

Laura and Almanzo's romance continues to blossom until he offers her an engagement ring. She accepts his proposal to be married the following summer. Her affection is tested when he announces that he must go to his family in Minnesota and will not be back until spring. She finds that life no longer feels complete without him, only to be reunited briefly on Christmas Eve, when he returns to be with her.

While in Minnesota, Almanzo told his family of the engagement, and his older sister, Eliza Jane, Laura's former teacher, planned to arrive in spring to throw a huge, fancy wedding that neither Almanzo nor Laura want or can afford. To stop Eliza Jane from taking over their wedding, Laura agrees to be married at the end of that week. Almanzo rushes to finish their house while she hurries to complete her trousseau. They are married quietly in a small ceremony by the local pastor. She says a tearful but loving goodbye to her family before leaving for the little house Almanzo has built for them.

Historical background

"Lew Brewster" was a pseudonym for Louis Bouchie.  He was a distant relative of Mr. Boast, a good friend of the Ingalls who appears in several of the books.  Bouchie and Genevieve Masters were the only two people whose names Wilder changed for her books, as Nellie and Louis Bouchie's wife were both unpleasant people, and she wished to respect their privacy.

Today there is a small town called Carthage, South Dakota, located where Wilder placed the Brewster settlement, although it is unclear if Carthage grew out of the original Bouchie (Brewster) Settlement.

Nellie Oleson, depicted in this story, is actually a combination of two of Wilder's rivals:  Genevieve Masters, in the school passages, and Stella Gilbert, in the passages about the buggy rides with Wilder and Almanzo.  The news Wilder hears near the end of the book, that "Nellie has gone back East", refers to Genevieve Masters.

Reception 

Virginia Kirkus, Wilder's first editor at Harper, approved the novel in Kirkus Reviews as "a splendid addition to the other fine books in the series". The 3rd to 6th volumes had received starred reviews.

The novel joined the 4th to 7th volumes as Newbery Honor Books.

References

External links

 
 Little House Books at HarperCollins Children's Books

1943 American novels
1943 children's books
Children's historical novels
Harper & Brothers books
Little House books
Newbery Honor-winning works
Novels set in South Dakota
Novels set in the 1880s